Aetheolaena decipiens is a species of flowering plant in the family Asteraceae. It is endemic to Ecuador, where it grows as a vine in high Andean forest habitat.

References

decipiens
Endemic flora of Ecuador
Endangered plants
Taxonomy articles created by Polbot